Giovan Battista Aleotti (1546 – 12 December 1636) was an Italian architect.

Biography
Aleotti was born in Argenta. For some years, Aleotti went to Ferrara, to work under Alfonso II d'Este where with Alessandro Balbi he designed the façade of the University in 1610. He gave a new façade to the Rocca Scandiano, the home of the Boiardo family. He is known for his designs in Parma, including the Teatro Farnese (1618–1628) and, with the assistance of his pupil Giovanni Battista Magnani, the hexagonal church of Santa Maria del Quartiere (1604-1619). He also helped design the facades of the Palazzi Bentivoglio and Bevilacqua-Costabili in Ferrara.

References 
 

1546 births
1636 deaths
Italian Baroque architects
People from the Province of Ferrara
16th-century Italian architects
17th-century Italian architects